Dariusz Kajetan Rosati  (born 8 August 1946 as Gaetano Dario Rosati) is a Polish professor of economics and a politician who served as a member of the European Parliament from 2004–2019, and subsequently as a deputy of the Sejm since 2019.

Biography

Academic
Dariusz Rosati graduated from the Faculty of International Trade at the SGH Warsaw School of Economics in 1969 and immediately afterwards started working there as an assistant. In 1973 he defended his doctoral thesis and in 1978 he received his habilitacja in economic sciences. He has been a professor of economics since 1990.

He is a supporter of a united Europe, the author of numerous publications on European integration and the rector of Lazarski School of Commerce and Law in Warsaw.

Political
From 1966–1990 he was a member of Polish United Workers Party (PZPR) and in the 1980s he was an economic adviser to Mieczysław Rakowski's government, the last such government of the communist Polish People's Republic (PRL). In the 1990s he was a supporter (but not a member) of the post-communist parties, first Democratic Left Alliance (SLD), and today Social Democratic Party of Poland (SDPL).

Dariusz Rosati was a co-founder and director of the Global Economy Institute (Instytut Gospodarki Światowej) and the Institute of Economic Situations and Prices (Instytut Koniunktur i Cen). He worked as an expert in various international organisations, including the Economic Commission for Europe of the United Nations in Geneva and adviser to the Chairman of the European Commission in Brussels.

He was the Minister of Foreign Affairs in the cabinets of Józef Oleksy and Włodzimierz Cimoszewicz (both SLD), and more recently he was a member of the Polish Council of Monetary Policies.

In the European elections on 13 June 2004 he was elected as a MEP for the SDPL in constituency No. 4 Warsaw and received 76,834 votes (11.94%). In 2014 he was once more elected to the European Parliament and joined the European People's Party Group (EPP Group). He represented the Lubuskie Region as well as Western Pomerania. He was a member of the ECON Committee as well as the PANA Committee, where he also served at the EPP's Coordinator.

In 2009 he founded Alliance for the Future, however the party was very short-lived.

In 2019, after failing to be re-elected as a MEP, he was subsequently elected as a deputy of the Sejm for the Civic Platform (PO) in constituency No. 19 Warsaw with 25,061 votes. In 2021, he became a full member of the Civic Platform, having co-operated with said party since 2011.

Alleged collaboration with communist secret service
In November 2007, the Institute of National Remembrance (IPN) said that Dariusz Rosati was registered as a secret collaborator "candidate" and "protection" by the Ministry of Interior I Department and II Department. Later on he was registered as an operational contact. However, in July 2007 Dariusz Rosati has made a statement in which he denied that cooperation went beyond sporadic contacts. His vetting (lustracja) declaration was approved by the Ombudsman of the Public Interest and prosecutor of the IPN. Thus he was not a secret collaborator at any time during his life.

Personal life
Dariusz Rosati's father, the Italian-born Angelo, was held as a prisoner of war in Poland during World War II, and after the war briefly settled in Łódź. His mother, Wanda, worked as a forced labourer in Nazi Germany. His parents divorced shortly after his birth, and his father left for France. When Rosati was ten years old, his mother renounced his Italian citizenship on his behalf, and also Polonised and rearranged his name.

Rosati met his future wife Teresa (born 1946) while studying at university, and married in 1971. They have two children, a son (Marcin) and a daughter (Weronika).

See also
 2004 European Parliament election in Poland

References

External links
 http://www.rosati.pl
 http://www.radom.pl/uk/

1946 births
Living people
People from Radom
Ministers of Foreign Affairs of Poland
Polish economists
Recipients of the Order of Polonia Restituta (1944–1989)
Social Democracy of Poland MEPs
MEPs for Poland 2004–2009
Polish people of Italian descent
MEPs for Poland 2014–2019
Members of the Polish Sejm 2011–2015
Members of the Polish Sejm 2019–2023